Rosario Damiano Maddaloni (born 2 July 1998) is an Italian footballer who plays as a defender for  club Imolese.

Club career
He made his Serie C debut for Fano on 17 September 2017 in a game against FeralpiSalò.

On 22 August 2018, he joined Serie C club Rende on a season-long loan. Rende had a buyout option at the end of the season.

On 25 July 2019 he signed a 2-year contract with Cesena.

On 26 August 2022, Maddaloni moved to Lucchese. On 24 January 2023, he joined Imolese.

References

External links
 

1998 births
Living people
Footballers from Palermo
Italian footballers
Association football defenders
Serie C players
Palermo F.C. players
Alma Juventus Fano 1906 players
Rende Calcio 1968 players
Cesena F.C. players
Lucchese 1905 players
Imolese Calcio 1919 players